Right Thing or The Right Thing may refer to:

 Ethics, the study of right and wrong conduct
 "The Right Thing" (song), a 1987 single by Simply Red
 The Right Thing (film), a 1963 comedy Australian TV play
 "The Right Thing", a season 4 episode of the sitcom New Girl
 "The right thing", also called the "MIT approach", a perfectionistic approach to software development described by Richard P. Gabriel in the influential essay "Lisp: Good News, Bad News, How to Win Big"

See also
 "The Right Thing to Do", a 1972 song by Carly Simon